Bijan "Justin" Kangarloo (born February 10, 1985, in Calgary, Alberta) is a Canadian-Iranian cross-country skier who has competed since 2003. Kangarloo was born in Calgary, Alberta, Canada, to an Iranian father.

References 

1985 births
Living people
Skiers from Calgary
Canadian people of Iranian descent
Asian Games silver medalists for Iran
Asian Games bronze medalists for Iran
Asian Games medalists in ski orienteering
Ski-orienteers at the 2011 Asian Winter Games
Cross-country skiers at the 2011 Asian Winter Games
Medalists at the 2011 Asian Winter Games